= Fernando Gomes Martins =

Portuguese chemist

Fernando Gomes Martins, Ph.D. in chemical engineering, is a Portuguese chemist, who is active in the field of multivariate statistical methods and models; he is an associate professor (FEUP) at the laboratory for process engineering, environment, biotechnology and energy (LEPABE) of the University of Porto and senior researcher and coordinator of the research group "Process Systems Engineering".

== Literature ==
- Jing-Han Wang, Lin-Lan Zhuang, Xue-Qiao Xu, Victor M. Deantes-Espinosa, Xiao-Xiong Wang. Microalgal attachment and attached systems for biomass production and wastewater treatment // Renewable and Sustainable Energy Reviews. — 2018. — September (vol. 92). — P. 331–342. — ISSN 1364-0321. — DOI:10.1016/j.rser.2018.04.081.
- Jiří Jaromír Klemeš, Petar Sabev Varbanov, Timothy G. Walmsley, Xuexiu Jia. New directions in the implementation of Pinch Methodology (PM) // Renewable and Sustainable Energy Reviews. — 2018. — December (vol. 98). — P. 439–468. — ISSN 1364-0321. — DOI:10.1016/j.rser.2018.09.030.

== Web-sources ==
- "Fernando Gomes Martins: Senior Researcher and Coordinator of the Research group Process Systems Engineering". LEPABE - Laboratory for Process Engineering, Environment, Biotechnology and Energy, University of Porto.
